Nikaea longipennis is a moth in the family Erebidae. It is found in Kumaon, Nepal, Sikkim, Assam and China (Sichuan, Yunnan, Shaanxi, Hubei, Jiangxi, Zhejiang, Fujian). The species was described by Francis Walker in 1855.

References

Moths described in 1855
Callimorphina